Baldan Mizhitdorzhievich Tsyzhipov (born 30 May 1990 in Chita Oblast) is a Russian freestyle wrestler of Buryat heritage. He won one of the bronze medals in the 125 kg event at the 2020 European Wrestling Championships held in Rome, Italy.

Major results

References

External links 
 

Living people
1990 births
Russian male sport wrestlers
European Wrestling Championships medalists
20th-century Russian people
21st-century Russian people